In computer science, programming by example (PbE), also termed programming by demonstration or more generally as demonstrational programming, is an end-user development technique for teaching a computer new behavior by demonstrating actions on concrete examples. The system records user actions and infers a generalized program that can be used on new examples.

PbE is intended to be easier to do than traditional computer programming, which generally requires learning and using a programming language.  Many PbE systems have been developed as research prototypes, but few have found widespread real-world application.  More recently, PbE has proved to be a useful paradigm for creating scientific work-flows. PbE is used in two independent clients for the BioMOBY protocol: Seahawk and Gbrowse moby.

Also the programming by demonstration (PbD) term has been mostly adopted by robotics researchers for teaching new behaviors to the robot through a physical demonstration of the task. The usual distinction in literature between these terms is that in PbE the user gives a prototypical product of the computer execution, such as a row in the desired results of a query; while in PbD the user performs a sequence of actions that the computer must repeat, generalizing it to be used in different data sets. For final users, to automate a workflow in a complex tool (e.g. Photoshop), the most simple case of PbD is the  macro recorder.

See also
 Query by Example
 Automated machine learning
 Example-based machine translation
 Inductive programming
 Lapis (text editor), which allows simultaneous editing of similar items in multiple selections created by example
 Programming by demonstration
 Test-driven development

References

External links
 Henry Lieberman's page on Programming by Example
 Online copy of Watch What I Do, Allen Cypher's book on Programming by Demonstration
 Online copy of Your Wish is My Command, Henry Lieberman's sequel to Watch What I Do
 A Visual Language for Data Mapping, John Carlson's description of an Integrated Development Environment (IDE) that used Programming by Example (desktop objects) for data mapping, and an iconic language for recording operations

User interfaces
Programming paradigms
Machine learning